Werner Park is a minor league ballpark located just west of Papillion, Nebraska, a suburb in Sarpy County southwest of Omaha. Opened in 2011, it is owned by Sarpy County. It is the home of the Omaha Storm Chasers (the Triple A affiliate of the Kansas City Royals) and USL League One professional soccer club Union Omaha. The Omaha Mavericks of the University of Nebraska Omaha also use the stadium for some home college baseball games.

History

From 1969 through 2010, the Omaha Royals (named the Golden Spikes from 1999 to 2001) played at Rosenblatt Stadium located in downtown Omaha. Every year, the Royals had to go on an extended two-week road trip in late May or early June to accommodate the NCAA's College World Series. The Royals were also hobbled by Rosenblatt's size. At 23,000 seats in its final configuration, it was far too large for a Triple-A team; it had 5,000 more seats than the next-largest stadium, Buffalo's Coca-Cola Field. In hopes of providing a more intimate setting, capacity was reduced to around 8,500 for Royals games.

When the city of Omaha announced plans to build a new ballpark in downtown Omaha for the College World Series, TD Ameritrade Park, original plans called for its capacity to be reduced to around 12,000 for Royals games. However, the Royals opted instead to build their own park elsewhere with a smaller seating capacity. The separate parks allow the Storm Chasers to play at home during the College World Series.

Groundbreaking took place August 12, 2009, and on November 11, 2010, the Royals announced they had reached an agreement with Omaha-based transportation company and longtime sponsor Werner Enterprises for the ballpark's naming rights. Per club policy, the terms of the deal were not disclosed. The Omaha Storm Chasers, sporting their new name and livery that were announced on November 15, 2010, moved into Werner Park on December 17.

The stadium's first event was a rivalry high school game on April 11, 2011, between Papillion's two high schools, Papillion South and Papillion-LaVista; the South Titans won, 2–0, over the Monarchs. The Storm Chasers opened the ballpark five days later on April 16 with a 2–1 victory over the Nashville Sounds, as top prospect Eric Hosmer went 3-for-3 in the victory.

A statue of hometown pitching legend Bob Gibson was unveiled outside the park entrance in 2013. 

Since 2013, the Omaha Mavericks of the University of Nebraska Omaha have used the venue for some home college baseball games.

In July 2015, the Storm Chasers hosted the Triple-A All-Star Game and Home Run Derby, the first time the events had been held in Omaha. The Derby, which was won by the Norfolk Tides' Dariel Álvarez, was held on July 13. The All-Star Game was held two days later on July 15. The Storm Chasers were represented at the game by Cheslor Cuthbert, Louis Coleman, and John Lamb as well as trainer Dave Innicca and manager Brian Poldberg, who skippered the PCL team. The IL All-Stars defeated the PCL All-Stars, 4–3.

From the fall of 2019 to the spring of 2020, Werner Park underwent a $2.4 million renovation in order to prepare the playing surface and facilities for USL League One professional soccer club Union Omaha, scheduled to begin play in spring 2020. Modifications included a retractable pitcher's mound, alterations to the right field foul pole, and a new building in left field to house team staff and equipment.

See also
 Sports in Omaha

References

External links

 
 Omaha Storm Chasers: official site
 Nebraska-Omaha Mavericks baseball: official site

Baseball venues in Nebraska
Minor league baseball venues
College baseball venues in the United States
Buildings and structures in Sarpy County, Nebraska
Tourist attractions in Sarpy County, Nebraska
2011 establishments in Nebraska
Sports venues completed in 2011
Omaha Mavericks baseball
Soccer venues in Nebraska
International League ballparks
USL League One stadiums
Union Omaha